The Adult Pop Airplay (formerly known as Adult Pop Songs and Adult Top 40) chart is published weekly by Billboard magazine and ranks "the most popular adult top 40 as based on radio airplay detections measured by Nielsen Broadcast Data Systems."

It is a format in which the genre is geared more towards an adult audience who are not into hard rock, hip hop, or adult contemporary fare. The main genres within this format are alternative rock and mainstream pop that is more adult-oriented. It is not to be confused with adult contemporary where rather lesser-known and more ballad-driven songs are played. The current number one song on the chart is "Flowers" by Miley Cyrus.

History
The chart was first published in the March 16, 1996, issue of Billboard; however, historically, the chart's introduction was in October 1995, when it began as a test chart.

The Adult Top 40 chart was formed following a split of the "Hot Adult Contemporary" chart due to the growing emergence of Adult Top 40 radio stations in the 1990s. These stations played a wider variety of artists and saw a faster turnover of songs compared to traditional adult contemporary radio. Songs by modern rock, dance, and R&B artists were mixed in with acts more closely associated with adult contemporary. According to Billboard, splitting the chart "better reflect[s] the music being played on adult contemporary and adult/top 40 stations."

The first number-one song on the Adult Top 40, from the test chart of October 7, 1995, was "Kiss from a Rose" by Seal. The first number-one song on the Adult Top 40, from the published chart of March 16, 1996, was "One Sweet Day" by Mariah Carey and Boyz II Men.

Records and achievements

Most weeks at number one

25 weeks
 "Smooth" – Santana featuring Rob Thomas (1999–2000)
23 weeks
 "Wherever You Will Go" – The Calling (2001–02)
20 weeks
 "Blinding Lights" – The Weeknd (2020)
18 weeks
 "Unwell" – Matchbox Twenty (2003)
 "Photograph" – Nickelback (2005–06)
17 weeks
 "Iris" – Goo Goo Dolls (1998)
16 weeks
 "Complicated" – Avril Lavigne (2002)
15 weeks
 "Don't Speak" – No Doubt (1996–97)
 "How to Save a Life" – The Fray (2006–07)
 "High Hopes" – Panic! at the Disco (2018–19)
14 weeks
 "Torn" – Natalie Imbruglia (1998)
 "Everything You Want" – Vertical Horizon (2000)
 "Drops of Jupiter (Tell Me)" – Train (2001)
 "Girls Like You" – Maroon 5 featuring Cardi B (2018)
 "Memories" – Maroon 5 (2019–20)

Sources:

Artists with the most number-one songs

Artists with the most cumulative weeks at number one

Artists with the most top-ten songs

Longest break between number ones
 Coldplay – eight years and eight months
 Train – six years, four months and one week
 Maroon 5 – five years, 10 months and one week

Additional achievements
 Shawn Mendes is the first artist to have four songs hit number one on the chart before age 20.

See also
List of artists who reached number one on the U.S. Adult Top 40 chart
Adult Contemporary (chart)
Mainstream Top 40

References

External links
 Current Billboard Adult Pop Songs chart

Billboard charts